The Wright XRJ47 was an American ramjet engine developed in the 1950s to help propel the rocket-launched SM-64 Navaho supersonic intercontinental cruise missile. Although the design flight Mach Number was 2.75, a peak flight speed of Mach 3.0, at altitudes up to about 77000 ft, was envisaged. This very large ramjet had a number of design problems, including some difficulty in light-up. Development of the Navaho missile was cancelled along with the ramjet engine in 1957.

Design
The single cone supersonic intake supplied ram air to a long annular diffuser terminating at the aft-mounted cylindrical combustion chamber. The centreline of the intake system was gently curved, presumably to line up the intake face with the flow-field of the missile nose section.

The combustion chamber flame-holder consisted of a center-body pilot region, with three annular V-gutters interconnected by slanted radial V-gutters. Fuel jets were of variable area design.

A heat-shield, with multiple exit ports, provided cooling air for the jetpipe and the fixed area ratio convergent-divergent propelling nozzle. The exit diameter of the nozzle equaled that of the combustion chamber.

Specifications (XRJ47-W-5)

References

Further reading

Ramjet engines